The Harry Jepson Trophy is a rugby league competition contested by teams from successor leagues to the Rugby League Conference. It is named after Harry Jepson.

History

The Harry Jepson trophy was first contested in 1997 by members of the then Southern Conference. The conference was renamed the Rugby League Conference in 1998 and it began to expand from its initial base in the South of England and the Midlands. The winners of the various regional divisions would enter a play-off system culminating in a Grand Final for the trophy.

In 2005, the Conference changed structure with the formation of Premier Divisions for the stronger teams, the Harry Jepson trophy was then competed for by the winners of the Premier divisions with the regional division winners playing-off for the RLC Regional trophy.

In 2012, the national Conference was replaced by locally administered regional leagues but the Harry Jepson trophy continued to be contested by teams in some of these new regional leagues.

2012 structure

The winners of the Scottish Conference League Premier Division, the North East Rugby League Premier Division, the Midlands Rugby League Premier Division, the London & South East Men's League, the West of England, the South Premier and the East Rugby League played-off in a knock-out tournament that ended in a Grand Final.

Past winners

 1997 North London Skolars 
 1998 Crawley Jets
 1999 Chester Wolves
 2000 Crawley Jets
 2001 Teesside Steelers
 2002 Coventry Bears
 2003 Bridgend Blue Bulls
 2004 Widnes Saints
 2005 Bridgend Blue Bulls
 2006 South London Storm
 2007 St Albans Centurions
 2008 Nottingham Outlaws
 2009 West London Sharks
 2010 St Albans Centurions
 2011 Parkside Hawks
 2012 London Skolars A
 2013 South West London Chargers
 2014 South West London Chargers
 2015 South West London Chargers
 2016 Wests Warriors
2017 London & South East (Played as a regional representative competition.

See also

British rugby league system

References

Rugby League Conference
Rugby league competitions in the United Kingdom